Russell Gregoire MacLellan (born January 16, 1940) is a Canadian politician who served as the 24th premier of Nova Scotia from 1997 to 1999.

Early life
MacLellan was born in Halifax, Nova Scotia.

Federal politics
He was first elected to the House of Commons of Canada in the 1979 federal election for the riding of Cape Breton—The Sydneys and sat as a Liberal MP until 1997.

Provincial politics
In 1997, he became leader of the Nova Scotia Liberal Party and premier of the province after John Savage was forced to resign due to discontent within his party and sagging polls. MacLellan tried to revive the Liberal government's fortunes; he narrowly won a minority government in the 1998 election, but his government was defeated in a confidence vote in 1999 and then defeated in the resulting 1999 election. On January 26, 2000, Maclellan announced he would step down as Liberal leader on June 30. He continued to sit as an MLA until resigning in October 2000.

After politics
Following his resignation, MacLellan returned to practising law, working for the Halifax-based law firm, Merrick Holm.

References

External links

1940 births
Canadian people of Scottish descent
Liberal Party of Canada MPs
Living people
Members of the House of Commons of Canada from Nova Scotia
Nova Scotia political party leaders
Nova Scotia Liberal Party MLAs
People from Halifax, Nova Scotia
Premiers of Nova Scotia
University of King's College alumni
21st-century Canadian politicians